"Remember You Young" is a song co-written and recorded by American country music singer Thomas Rhett. It was released on July 15, 2019 as the second single from his fourth studio album Center Point Road. Rhett wrote the song with Ashley Gorley and Jesse Frasure, the latter of which produced it with Dann Huff.

History
Rhett says that the song carries a theme of nostalgia, and references to his wife and children. It also contains references to events from his past. He said that "We wrote this song about the people in life that we love, and always remembering them in their youth, no matter how much time passes and we all change." The song's accompanying music video features a group of elderly people who reminisce on their lives.

Commercial performance
"Remember You Young" reached No. 1 on Billboards Country Airplay chart on chart dated December 21, 2019, becoming Rhett's eighth consecutive No. 1 single and his fourteenth overall. The song has sold 143,000 copies in the United States as of February 2020.

Music video
The music video was directed by TK McKamy and premiered on CMT, GAC & Vevo in 2019.

It was filmed partly on the property of session and touring bassist Todd Ashburn in the Nashville area.

The video is a sequel  to the Marry Me music video. In addition to showing Rhett performing the song barefoot in a room full of mirrors, the video centers on Sam, now in his elderly years, goes about his daily routine while remembering moments of his time with Ellie, who is deceased as referred to by the ending shot of him holding an urn.

Personnel
Credits are adapted from the liner notes of Center Point Road.

Thomas Rhett – lead vocals, background vocals, producer
Joe Baldridge – recording
Dave Cohen – keyboards
Josh Ditty – assistant recording
Jesse Frasure – producer, programming
Charlie Judge – cello
Dann Huff – producer, electric guitar
David Huff – digital editing, programming
Chris Kimmerer – drums
Jason Mott – assistant recording
Justin Niebank – mixing
Adam Nyan – mastering
Jimmie Lee Sloas – bass
Chris Small – digital editing
Russell Terrell – background vocals
Ilya Toshinskiy – acoustic guitar
Derek Wells – electric guitar

Charts

Weekly charts

Year-end charts

Certifications

References

2019 songs
2019 singles
Country ballads
2010s ballads
Thomas Rhett songs
Songs written by Thomas Rhett
Songs written by Ashley Gorley
Songs written by Jesse Frasure
Big Machine Records singles
Song recordings produced by Dann Huff
Music videos directed by TK McKamy
Songs about nostalgia